Wu Wenzao was a Chinese sociologist, anthropologist, ethnologist. He was born in Jiangyin, Jiangsu. He was admitted into Tsinghua University at 1917. In 1923, his schoolmate Pan Guangdan (Quentin Kuang-tan Pan) persuaded him to go abroad to study at Dartmouth College after his graduation from Tsinghua. The classes in biology, chemistry, and the other natural sciences at Dartmouth greatly influenced him, and he later attempted to have his students use the scientific methods in their social studies. In 1925, he was admitted into Columbia University, and in 1928 he got his PhD in the Department of Sociology. In 1929, he married Bing Xin, when they were studying in the United States. Together, he and Bing Xin visited different intellectual circles around the world, communicating with other intellectuals such as Virginia Woolf. In 1938 he founded the Department of Sociology of Yunnan University, after 1950 he served as a professor of Central College for Nationalities. Fei Xiaotong, Lin Yaohua, Huang Huajie, Qu Tongzu were his students. Wu greatly promoted localization of sociology and ethnology in China as a whole.

Wu Wenzao is one of the pioneers and the guide of Chinese ethnological anthropology. Since the early 1940s, he has vigorously advocated the academic thought of Chinese ethnological anthropology. For more than half a century, Wu Wenzao's thought has guided the development direction of Chinese ethnological anthropology.

External links
腾飞中国：吴文藻的身份

x

Chinese sociologists
Columbia Graduate School of Arts and Sciences alumni
Scientists from Wuxi
Academic staff of Yenching University
Academic staff of Yunnan University
Tsinghua University alumni
Academic staff of Minzu University of China
1901 births
1985 deaths
Educators from Wuxi
People from Jiangyin